The 1950 Tennessee gubernatorial election was held on November 7, 1950. Incumbent Democrat Gordon Browning defeated Independent John Randolph Neal Jr. with 78.09% of the vote.

Primary elections
Primary elections were held on August 3, 1950.

Democratic primary

Candidates
Gordon Browning, incumbent Governor
Clifford Allen, State Senator
John Randolph Neal Jr., attorney
Porter Freeman

Results

General election

Candidates
Gordon Browning, Democratic
John Randolph Neal Jr., Independent

Results

References

1950
Tennessee
Gubernatorial